Assumption of the Virgin may refer to one of three paintings by Guido Reni:
Assumption of the Virgin (Reni, Castelfranco Emilia)
Assumption of the Virgin (Reni, Lyon)
Assumption of the Virgin (Reni, Munich)